This is a list of the counts of Avranches, a French fief in the Middle Ages.

House of Almada

1445–1449 Álvaro Vaz de Almada, 1st Count of Avranches, KG (created by Henry VI of England); Avranches was lost to France soon after
1476–1496 Fernando de Almada, 2nd Count of Avranches (created by Louis XI of France), 5th Lord of Lagares d' El-Rei jure uxoris

The following are the holders of the title by right, by virtue of inheritance under the salic law, even if some of them did not make use of it: 
1496–15?? Antão de Almada, 3rd Count of Avranches, 6th Lord of Lagares d' El-Rei
15??–15?? Fernando de Almada, 4th Count of Avranches, 7th Lord of Lagares d' El-Rei, 2nd Lord of Pombalinho jure uxoris
15??–15?? Antão Soares de Almada, 5th Count of Avranches, 8th Lord of Lagares d' El-Rei, 3rd Lord of Pombalinho
15??–16?? Lourenço Soares de Almada, 6th Count of Avranches, 9th Lord of Lagares d' El-Rei, 4th Lord of Pombalinho
15??–1644 Antão de Almada, 7th Count of Avranches, 10th Lord of Lagares d' El-Rei, 5th Lord of Pombalinho
1644–1660 Luís de Almada, 8th Count of Avranches, 11th Lord of Lagares d' El-Rei, 6th Lord of Pombalinho
1660–1669 Antão de Almada e Meneses, 9th Count of Avranches, did not succeed his father in Portugal
1669–1729 Lourenço de Almada, 10th Count of Avranches, 12th Lord of Lagares d' El-Rei, 7th Lord of Pombalinho; his son succeeded him in Portugal vita patris
1729–17?? Lourenço de Almada, 11th Count of Avranches, 14th Lord of Lagares d' El-Rei, 9th Lord of Pombalinho
17??–1797 Antão de Almada, 12th Count of Avranches, 15th Lord of Lagares d' El-Rei jure uxoris, 10th Lord of Pombalinho jure uxoris
1797–1815 Lourenço José Boaventura de Almada, 13th Count of Avranches, 1st Count of Almada, 16th Lord of Lagares d' El-Rei, 11th Lord of Pombalinho
1815–1834 Antão José Maria de Almada, 14th Count of Avranches, 2nd Count of Almada, 17th Lord of Lagares d' El-Rei, 12th Lord of Pombalinho
1834–1874 Lourenço José Maria de Almada de Abreu Pereira Cyrne Peixoto, 15th Count of Avranches, 3rd Count of Almada, 18th Lord of Lagares d' El-Rei, 13th Lord of Pombalinho
1874–1909 José Maria de Almada, 16th Count of Avranches, 19th Lord of Lagares d' El-Rei, 14th Lord of Pombalinho
1909–1916 Miguel Vaz de Almada, 17th Count of Avranches, 20th Lord of Lagares d' El-Rei, 15th Lord of Pombalinho
1916–1919 Luís Vaz de Almada, 18th Count of Avranches, 21st Lord of Lagares d' El-Rei, 16th Lord of Pombalinho
1919–1978 Lourenço Vaz de Almada, 19th Count of Avranches, 4th Count of Almada, 22nd Lord of Lagares d' El-Rei, 17th Lord of Pombalinho
1978–1998 Luís Francisco de Almada, 20th Count of Avranches, 5th Count of Almada, 23rd Lord of Lagares d' El-Rei, 18th Lord of Pombalinho
1998–present Lourenço José de Almada, 21st Count of Avranches, 6th Count of Almada, 24th Lord of Lagares d' El-Rei, 19th Lord of Pombalinho
Heir presumptive: Luís Manuel de Almada, future 22nd Count of Avranches, future 7th Count of Almada, 25th Lord of Lagares d' El-Rei, 20th Lord of Pombalinho

Notes

Sources
 Various, "Nobreza de Portugal e do Brasil", Lisbon, Portugal, 1960, Volume Segundo, pp. 356–357
 Various, "Armorial Lusitano", Lisbon, Portugal, 1961, pp. 26–27 and pp. 42–43
 Visconde de Figanière, "Alguns Documentos Acerca do Conde de Avranches", in Panorama, 3rd Series, Vol. V, Nr. 9

 
Lists of French nobility
Lists of counts of France